The Palace Hotel, at 429 Main St. in Antonito, Colorado, was built in 1890.  It was listed on the National Register of Historic Places in 1994.

It is a two-story building constructed of sandstone.

References

External links

Hotels in Colorado
National Register of Historic Places in Conejos County, Colorado
Late 19th and Early 20th Century American Movements architecture
Buildings and structures completed in 1890